Jason Lonergan (born 1994) is an Irish Gaelic footballer who plays as a left corner-forward for the Tipperary senior team.

Born in Clonmel, County Tipperary, Lonergan first played competitive Gaelic football during his schooling at CBS High School Clonmel. He arrived on the inter-county scene at the age of sixteen when he first linked up with the Tipperary minor team before later joining the under-21 side. He made his senior debut during the 2015 championship. Lonergan immediately became a regular member of the starting fifteen.

At club level Lonergan is a one-time championship medal with Clonmel Commercials.

On 22 November 2020, Lonergan was a substitute as Tipperary won the 2020 Munster Senior Football Championship after a 0-17 to 0-14 win against Cork in the final. It was Tipperary's first Munster title in 85 years.

Honours

Player

Clonmel Commercials
Tipperary Senior Football Championship (1): 2012

Tipperary
Munster Under-21 Football Championship (1): 2015 (c)
All-Ireland Minor Football Championship (1): 2011
Munster Minor Football Championship (2): 2011, 2012
Munster Senior Football Championship (1): 2020

References

1994 births
Living people
Clonmel Commercials Gaelic footballers
Tipperary inter-county Gaelic footballers
People educated at CBS High School Clonmel